Miss Porter's School (MPS) is an elite American private college preparatory school for girls founded in 1843, and located in Farmington, Connecticut. The school draws students from 21 states, 31 countries (with dual-citizenship and/or residence), and 17 countries (citizenship alone) and international students comprised 14% as of the 2017–2018 year. The average class size was 10 students in 2017.

The community traditionally denotes those new to campus collectively as New Girls, those returning members as Old Girls, and alumnae as Ancients.

History

Early history and Sarah Porter 

Miss Porter's School was established in 1843 by education reformer Sarah Porter, who recognized the importance of women's education. She was insistent that the school's curriculum include chemistry, physiology, botany, geology, and astronomy in addition to the more traditional Latin, French, German, spelling, reading, arithmetic, trigonometry, history, and geography. Also encouraged were such athletic opportunities as tennis, horseback riding, and in 1867 the school formed its own baseball team, the Tunxises, the name of which itself harkens back to those members of the Saukiog tribe who originally settled the area on which the school is situated.

Mary Dunning Dow (1884–1903) 
In 1884, Sarah Porter hired her former student, Mary Elizabeth Dunning Dow, with whom she began to share more of her duties as Head of School. From then until her death in 1900, Porter gradually relinquished her control of the school to Dow.

Sarah Porter's will named her nephew, Robert Porter Keep, as executor of her estate, of which the school was the most valuable asset. Dow's compensation for her position as sole Head of School was also specified in the will. As executor, Robert Keep began extensive repairs and renovations to the school. While Dow continued to receive a salary as per Porter's will, she became convinced that Keep, in diverting the school's income to pay for construction, was enriching his inheritance with funds that were rightfully hers. The conflict escalated and culminated in Dow's resignation in 1903. She moved to Briarcliff, New York, taking with her as many as 140 students and 16 faculty members, and began Mrs. Dow's School for Girls, which would come to be known as Briarcliff Junior College only to be absorbed by Pace University in 1977.

Elizabeth Hale Keep and Robert Keep (1903–1943) 
Robert Keep announced in July 1903 that the school would reopen in October of that year with his wife, Elizabeth Vashti Hale Keep as Head of School, eleven teachers, and between five and sixteen students in attendance. After Keep succumbed to pneumonia and died on July 3, 1904, Elizabeth Keep continued his legacy of renovation and construction. One of her many legacies was the establishment of a kindergarten for children of her employees. The kindergarten, on Garden Street, became the Village Cooperative Nursery School, and is no longer connected with Miss Porter's School. When Mrs. Keep died of influenza on March 28, 1917, leadership of the school passed to her stepson, Robert Porter Keep, Jr., who moved to Farmington from Andover, Massachusetts where he had been teaching German at Phillips Academy. From 1917 until the school's Centennial, in 1943, he and his wife, RoseAnne Day Keep, remained Heads of School at Miss Porter's.

Robert Keep appointed members to the first Board of Trustees in 1943, including:

 Wilmarth S. Lewis, Yale University's Horace Walpole scholar
 Annie Burr Auchincloss Lewis, Wilmarth Lewis's wife
 The Rev. Palfrey Perkins, a senior minister at King's Chapel
 Lewis Perry, headmaster of Phillips Exeter Academy
 George H. Richards, a lawyer and Mr. Keep's classmate at Yale University

Centennial (1943) 
The school was incorporated as a non-profit institution during the school's Centennial in 1943, with the primary purpose as a college preparatory school rather than its previous reputation as a finishing school for the social elite. Also in 1943, the school ended the tradition of choosing a successive Head of School from the Porter family tree, selecting as its Heads, Ward L. Johnson and his wife Katharine Johnson.

Katherine Windsor (2009–present) 
Since 2009, the Head of School is Katherine Windsor, who draws on her past experience running the Center for Talented Youth program at Johns Hopkins University and The Sage School in Foxborough, Massachusetts. Her tenure as Head of School has seen the school, among other things, instantiate its partnership with the University of Pennsylvania Graduate School of Education’s Independent School Teaching Residency program. On March 31, 2021, Windsor announced via her Twitter account that she is currently serving as a faculty member at the UPenn Graduate School of Education.

As of 2022, the school's endowment was estimated at $142.3 million.

Campus

The 40-acre campus overlooks the Farmington River and includes a number of historically significant buildings which have collectively served the wider Farmington community in a range of functional capacities over their respective histories. Over the years, the school has transformed its campus assets to suit its needs.

The school currently maintains a total of nine student residence halls, two of which are strictly limited to the senior class: Brick, Colony, Humphrey, Keep, Lathrop, Macomber, Main, New Place, and Ward.

Academic facilities

 Main building: The main building is located at 60 Main Street. The front door of which is depicted on the school seal, was built in 1830 as the Union Hotel on Main Street. Originally intended to serve patrons of the nearby Farmington Canal, it was rented to Sarah Porter in 1848 until her eventual purchase on April 19, 1866. Retrofitted with a kitchen during a renovation c. 1870s, the building serves as the central-most hub of campus life. More recently, the dining hall was expanded to accommodate the school's burgeoning enrollment; a project which also saw the campus security office and adjacent student spaces reimagined with intentions to bring the whole facility around to bear a closer historic resemblance to the original hotel, and the school opting to have the structure outfitted with an elevator to facilitate access.
 Thomas Hart Grist Mill: The Thomas Hart Grist Mill dates back to the 1600s and predates most of the structures in its vicinity. Until the 1960s, the site was a functioning grist mill noted for its historical service to President Calvin Coolidge. In 2012, the building was purchased by the school and renovated, it now serves as the school's admissions office.
Thomas Hart Hooker House: The Thomas Hart Hooker House was built in 1770 and is located on Main Street. It currently serves as the campus alumnae/i and development office.
Faculty housing: The historical buildings Major Timothy Cowles House, and Samuel Deming Store (also known as F.L. Scott Store, Your Village Store) are both located in Mills Street and serve as faculty housing.
M. Burch Tracy Ford Library: The M. Burch Tracy Ford Library, often abbreviated to Ford, is one of the newer academic facilities on campus. It is named for the school's eleventh Head of School and houses over 22,000 volumes, electronic books, magazines, journals, newspapers in addition to a collection of 1,308 academic and entertainment DVDs and videos. The building also houses a computer lab and eight study rooms.
 Hamilton building: Hamilton was previously a dorm, and is currently home to the English and History departments. It is named for the Hamilton sisters, most notably Alice and Edith.
 Leila Dilworth Jones ’44 Memorial: The Leila Dilworth Jones ’44 Memorial is commonly abbreviated to Jones or Jones Memorial. It served as a pharmacy prior to the school's founding, is home to the language department, where students may immerse themselves in modern and classical cultures including, but not limited to, Spanish, Latin, French, or Mandarin. As with most buildings on campus, Jones Memorial has served in many operational capacities to suit the school's functional needs, sporadically as faculty housing and as temporary storage for the school's library contents.
 Kate Lewis Gym: The Kate Lewis Gym, at one time serving as the campus's only gym and theater. It now serves as the schools music rehearsal space. In the years since it was built and incorporated into the campus, it has served in a variety of functional capacities as befits the advancement of the school's mission and, in its current state, is considered to be home to the school's student a cappella group, The Perilhettes. The space is wedged between Main and the space known to the community as Counting House, itself once housing the music program and currently serving in an administrative capacity as the school's business office. 
 Ann Whitney Olin Arts and Science Center: The Ann Whitney Olin Arts and Science Center, also known as Olin, is the main building for mathematics, science, and arts. The renovation and expansion of this building was designed by Tai Soo Kim.

Athletic facilities
Athletic facilities on campus include the Colgate Wellness Center, the Student Recreation Center, the Mellon Gymnasium, the Gaines Dance Barn, the Pool & Squash Building, the Farmington Boat House, Kiki's Field, and Oaklea Field.

Athletics

Porter's competes in the Founders League with Choate Rosemary Hall, Hotchkiss, Kent, Kingswood-Oxford, Loomis Chaffee, Taft and Westminster schools. At the end of each season, Porter's competes against the league's most competitive teams in the New England Championships. Porter's traditional rival is The Ethel Walker School.

Clubs, sports, and organizations

In addition to an array of club and varsity sports, the school boasts current slate of over fifty active student-run clubs and organizations that cater to a wide variety of its students’ interests. If a student doesn't find an organization that fits their specific interest or need, there is a process by which they can create their own. Amongst this wide array of clubs are a smattering of organizational boards that sustain each of the school's community-wide publications:

 Salmagundy is the school's student-run monthly newspaper, founded October 27, 1945. Salmagundy is now both an online and paper publication. 
 The school's journal for scholarly writing, Chautauqua, sharing its name with the US adult education movement, offers publication examples of student research across a variety of academic disciplines.
 The school's yearbook, Daeges Eage, literally translates from Old English to "eye of the day," from which the modern word "daisy" is derived. 
 Haggis/Baggis, the school's magazine for literature and fine arts, features student poems, short stories, photographs, and artwork. Since it was first published in 1967, the magazine has received numerous awards and recognitions.
 The Language Literary Magazine is a yearly publication which showcases writings by foreign language students, including essays, poems, commentaries, and dialogues.

Notable alumnae

References

External links

 

Private high schools in Connecticut
Boarding schools in Connecticut
Girls' schools in Connecticut
Preparatory schools in Connecticut
Schools in Hartford County, Connecticut
Educational institutions established in 1843
Farmington, Connecticut
1843 establishments in Connecticut